Andrew Lam (born 1964) is a Vietnamese American author and journalist who has written about the Overseas Vietnamese experience.

Biography
Andrew Lam was born Lâm Quang Dũng in 1964 in South Vietnam. He led a privileged life as the son of General Lâm Quang Thi of the Army of the Republic of Vietnam. He attended Lycée Yersin in Đà Lạt.

Lam left Vietnam with his family during the fall of Saigon in April 1975. He attended the University of California, Berkeley where he majored in biochemistry. He soon abandoned plans for medical school and entered a creative writing program at San Francisco State University. While still in school he began writing for Pacific News Service and in 1993 won the Outstanding Young Journalist Award from the Society of Professional Journalists.

A PBS documentary produced by WETA in 2004, My Journey Home, told 3 stories of Americans returning to their ancestral homelands, including of Lam's return to Vietnam.

He is currently the web editor of New America Media. He is also a journalist and short story writer. In 2005, he published a collection of essays, Perfume Dreams, about the problem of identity as a Vietnamese living in the U.S. Lam received the PEN/Beyond Margins Award in 2006 for Perfume Dreams: Reflections on the Vietnamese Diaspora. He is a regular contributor to National Public Radio's All Things Considered. His second book, East Eats West: Writing in Two Hemispheres is a meditation on east–west relations, and how Asian immigration changed the West. It was named Top Ten Indies by Shelf Unbound Magazine in 2010.

Birds of Paradise Lost, his third book, is a collection of short stories about Vietnamese newcomers struggling to remake their lives in the San Francisco Bay after a long, painful exodus from Vietnam.

Lam blogs regularly on Huffington Post.

He was a John S. Knight Journalism Fellow at Stanford University 2001–2002.

Though reticent about speaking about his sexuality, in 2009 Lam gave an interview for a collection of portraits of homosexual Americans.

Publications
Books 
"Perfume Dreams: Reflections on the Vietnamese Diaspora", (Heyday Books, 2005)
"East Eats West: Writing in Two Hemispheres," (Heyday Books, 2010)
"Birds of Paradise Lost," (Red Hen Press, 2013)

Essays
"Letter to a Vietnamese cousin: Should you come to America?", December 22, 2002
"Andrew Lam's essays on New America Media"
"Andrew Lam's essays on Huffington Post"

Fiction
"Slingshot" in Zyzzyva, winter 1998, available online

Short Stories
"Show and Tell"
"Letter to a young refugee from another", April 6, 1999

Quotes
 "Art is the lesser sister to medicine. It aims to heal."

Notes

External links
Video Diary of Andrew Lam
Viet Kieu
My Father's Army Uniform
Grandma's Tales, a short story
Regret To Mis-Inform
Andrew Lam page on Alternet
Andrew Lam page on WQED
"Cõi già trên đất lạ," a translation by Nguyễn Đức Nguyên of Andrew Lam's "Aging in a Foreign Land," printed here with original English version

1964 births
Living people
21st-century American businesspeople
American short story writers
American gay writers
Vietnamese emigrants to the United States
University of California, Berkeley alumni
Vietnamese writers
American writers of Vietnamese descent
American LGBT journalists
American male journalists
American male short story writers
American LGBT people of Asian descent
Gay journalists
Gay businessmen
PEN Oakland/Josephine Miles Literary Award winners
American male non-fiction writers
Vietnamese LGBT journalists
Vietnamese LGBT businesspeople
English-language literature of Vietnam
21st-century LGBT people